Mario Zanin may refer to
Mario Zanin (bishop) (1890–1958), Italian prelate and papal diplomat
Mario Zanin (cyclist) (born 1940), Italian cyclist